Sándor Csizmadia (10 March 1871 – 3 March 1929) was a Hungarian politician and poet, who served as People's Commissar of Agriculture during the Hungarian Soviet Republic. However soon his relations decayed with the leaders of the proletarian dictatorship, so he left the Hungarian Central Executive Council. He committed suicide in 1929.

Literary works
 Magyar Munkásdalok és versek (Orosháza, 1896)
 A földművelő-munkásság helyzete és feladata (Orosháza, 1896)
 Proletár költemények (Budapest, 1897)
 Küzdelem (Újabb versek, Budapest, 1903)
 Mit akarunk? (Budapest, 1903)
 Hajnalban (Budapest, 1905)
 Munkás emberek (short stories, Budapest, 1905)
 Fogházi levelek (Budapest, 1906)
 A feketék (Budapest, 1908)
 A nagy magyar parasztforradalom (Budapest, 1914)
 Válogatott költeményei (Budapest, 1919)

References
 Magyar Életrajzi Lexikon

1871 births
1929 suicides
People from Csongrád-Csanád County
People from the Kingdom of Hungary
Social Democratic Party of Hungary politicians
Hungarian communists
Agriculture ministers of Hungary
Hungarian politicians who committed suicide
Suicides in Hungary
1929 deaths